Duck decoy is an ambiguous term which may be applied to:

Duck decoy (structure), a device used to catch wildfowl consisting of a central pond and radiating water-filled arms
Duck decoy (model), a model duck used to attract other ducks